Buday I ibn Umal-Muhammad (Kumyk: Будай Умал-Магьаматны уланы) was a Kumyk shamkhal of Tarki and Gazikumukh from 1557 to 1567.

Biography 
He was born in Gazikumukh in the family of Gazikumukh shamkhal Umal Muhammad I. The first written mention of Buday I dates back to 1557, when Kabardian princes complained about him to tsar Ivan IV. He in alliance with the Tyumen Tatars made active attacks on the possessions of Temryuk Idar, the ruler of Kabardia. In response, in 1560, the Astrakhan governor Ivan Chemerisov on the orders of the tsar attacked the possessions of Buday, ruining Tarki. However, the latter eventually forced them to retreat.

After that, in alliance with Kazi-Mirza, bey of the Lesser Nogai Horde, Pshepshuko Kaytukin, the Grand Duke of the Kabardia they decided to oppose Russian encroachments. In 1567, at the confluence of the Sunzha and the Terek, Buday and later his brother Surkhay were killed on the battlefield, as evidenced by their gravestones at the Shamkhal cemetery in Gazikumukh.

See also 

 Kabardia

 Gazikumukh Shamkhalate
 Shamkhalate of Tarki

References

Sources 

 Magomedov, Murad (1997). History of Dagestan from ancient times to the end of the 20th-century. Makhachkala: Dagestan State University. p. 231. ISBN 978-5-7788-0138-7.

 Miziev, Ismail (2010-03-07). The history of Balkaria and Karachay in the writings of Ismail Miziev. Nalchik: Publishing house of M. and V. Kotlyarovs. pp. 277, 335. ISBN 978-5-93680-337-6.

 Gadzhiev, Vladilen (2013). History of Dagestan. Vol. 1. Tbilisi: Рипол Классик. p. 281. ISBN 978-5-458-34487-6.

External links 

 Kumyk fiefs in Russian-Iranian and Russian-Crimean relations in the second half of the 17th-century – cyberleninka.ru
1567 deaths
Shamkhals of Tarki
16th-century rulers
16th-century rulers in Europe
16th-century men
16th-century nobility
16th-century rulers in Asia
16th-century births
16th-century deaths
Kumyks